Repikhovo is a rural locality (a village) in Nagornoye Rural Settlement, Petushinsky District, Vladimir Oblast, Russia. The population was 22 as of 2010. There are 2 streets.

Geography 
Repikhovo is located 26 km west of Petushki (the district's administrative centre) by road. Molodino is the nearest rural locality.

References 

Rural localities in Petushinsky District